A marimba is a xylophone-like percussion instrument played with mallets. 

Marimba may also refer to:

Music
 Marimba (lamellophone), plucked box instrument also known as marímbula
 Marimbaphone, a tuned percussion instrument similar to the marimba
 Marimba-xylophone, another name for Xylorimba, a pitched percussion instrument corresponding to a xylophone with an extended range

Other uses
 Marimba, Angola, a municipality in Malanje Province, Angola
 Marimba, Inc., a former provider of configuration management software, bought by BMC Software in 2004
 Marimba Lumina, a MIDI controller invented by Donald Buchla
 Marimba Roney, Swedish journalist and television host

See also
 Mbira
 Marimbault
 Queen Marimba